Andersson Peak is an ice-capped peak,  high, with rocky exposures on its east side, lying  north of Cape Fairweather and  west of Tashukov Nunatak on the east coast of Graham Land, Antarctica. It was charted in 1947 by the Falkland Islands Dependencies Survey, and named by them for Karl Andreas Andersson, a zoologist with the Swedish Antarctic Expedition, who had explored along this coast in 1902.

See also
Andersson Nunatak

References 

Mountains of Graham Land
Oscar II Coast